Bradarić is a Bosnian and Croatian surname. Notable people with the surname include:

Ekrem Bradarić (born 1969), former Bosnian professional footballer
Filip Bradarić (born 1992), Croatian professional footballer
Domagoj Bradarić (born 1999), Croatian footballer

Bosnian surnames
Croatian surnames
Slavic-language surnames
Patronymic surnames